George Savage, (26 November 1941 – 1 October 2014) was a unionist politician in Northern Ireland. A native of County Armagh, he served in the Northern Ireland Assembly as an Ulster Unionist Party (UUP) member for Upper Bann from 1998 to 2003 and from 2007 to 2011. He was deselected by his constituency association ahead of the 2011 Assembly elections. In 1996 he was an unsuccessful candidate in the Northern Ireland Forum election in Upper Bann.

Born in Lurgan, he was the youngest of six children born to George, a dairy farmer and Jean (née Lamb) Savage. He was a member of the Orange Order and Royal Black Institution. A lifelong and devout Methodist, he was also a director of Glenavon F.C.

Savage died on 1 October 2014 at the age of 72. He was survived by his wife Joy and their three sons (Kyle, George and Nigel).

References

External links
 Biographical details from the official website of the Northern Ireland Assembly

1941 births
2014 deaths
Mayors of Craigavon
People from County Down
Ulster Unionist Party MLAs
Northern Ireland MLAs 1998–2003
Northern Ireland MLAs 2007–2011